Catone in Utica is an opera libretto by Metastasio, that was originally written for Leonardo Vinci's 1727 opera. Following Vinci's success, Metastasio's text was used by numerous composers of the baroque and classical eras for their own operas, including Pietro Torri (1736), Antonio Vivaldi (1737), Giovanni Battista Ferrandini (1753) and J. C. Bach (1761).

History
Before Metastasio's Catone in Utica libretto, Cato the Younger had already been the subject of following operas:
 Catone Uticensi, by Carlo Francesco Pollarolo (Venice 1701)
 Cato, German opera by Reinhard Keiser, text after Matteo Noris (Hamburg 1715)

Metastasio wrote Catone in Utica in Italian, as a libretto for an opera in three acts. He changed the name of Cornelia to Emilia and that of Juba to Arbace, as better suited for music. Leonardo Vinci set the libretto to music for the first time. Vinci's opera was premiered at the Teatro delle Dame, Rome, during the carnival of 1727.

Content
The subject of the libretto is the death of Cato the Younger, set in Utica. Following characters are represented:
 Catone (Cato the Younger)
 Cesare (Julius Caesar)
 Marzia, daughter of Catone, secretly in love with Cesare
 Arbace, Prince of Numidia, friend of Catone and lover of Marzia
 Emilia, widow of Pompeo (Pompey)
 Fulvio, legate of the Roman Senate and lover of Emilia.

Operas
Metastasio's libretto was also set by:
 Geminiano Giacomelli, Vienna, 1727
 Leonardo Leo, Venice, 1729 
 Johann Adolph Hasse, Turin, 1732
 George Frederick Handel, London, 1732, a pasticcio adapted mainly from Leo's 1729 setting, but transposing, editing or even entirely replacing its various arias to suit the skills of the singers he had at his disposal; some of the interpolated arias included pre-existing compositions by Porpora, Antonio Vivaldi, Hasse, and Leonardo Vinci.  
 Pietro Torri, Munich, 1736
 Antonio Vivaldi, Venice and Verona, 1737
 Egidio Duni, Italy, about 1738
 , Brunswick, 1743
 Carl Heinrich Graun, Berlin, 1744
 Niccolò Jommelli, Vienna, 1749
 Giovanni Battista Ferrandini, Munich, 1758
 Vincenzo Legrenzo Ciampi, Venice, 1750
 Florian Leopold Gassmann, Vienna, about 1760
 Johann Christian Bach, Naples, 1761
 Gian Francesco de Majo, Naples, 1763
 Niccolò Piccinni, Naples, 1770
 , Naples, 1777
 , Milan, 1782
 Giovanni Paisiello, Naples, 1788
 Peter Winter, Venice, 1791.

References

Sources
 
Volume I
Volume II
Volume III 

Libretti by Metastasio
1728 operas